Make It Right: The Series is a 2016 Thai boys’ love romantic comedy series aired on MCOT HD and Line TV. The series is based from the novel of the same name. It is broadcast on Sundays from 20:50 to 21:45 (Bangkok Standard Time) on MCOT HD, while the uncut version is shown on Line TV during midnight of the same day. The first season contains a total of 12 episodes with an average span of 45 minutes each. The series started its airing on 15 May 2016, and the first season ended on 31 July 2016. The story revolves around young boys’ budding relationships and how they deal with their feelings within themselves and in front of the judging society.

There is one main couple in the series. The Couple is the pairing of the actors Panichtamrong “Peak” Peemapol (playing the role of “Fuse”) and Udompanich “Boom” Krittapak (playing the role of “Tee”). There are also other couples and actors who bring life to the series. The scenes mostly takes place in a high school institution where most of the characters go to study.

A second and last season of the series aired from 7 May 2017 and ended 5 August 2017, with total of 14 episodes.

Cast

Main Characters 
 Panichtamrong "Peak" Peemapol (November 11, 1999. Bangkok, Thailand) as Fuse 
 Udompanich "Boom" Krittapak (January 12, 2001. Chiang Mai, Thailand) as Tee
 "Ohm" Pawat Chittsawangdee (March 22, 2000. Bangkok, Thailand) as Frame 
 Imerbpathom "Toey" Sittiwat (February 13, 1996. Bangkok, Thailand) as Book
 Techakumphu "Bonne" Manapat (June 11, 1994) as Nine
 Wongsamran "Aof" Sutiwas (February 22, 1996) as Yok
 Ratanaumnuayshai "Beam" Boonyakorn (March 29, 2001) as Rodtang

Supporting Characters 
 Chanchalerm "Proy" Manasaporn as Fing
 Ua-Ampon "Bright" Wichawet as Tan
 Sukpun "Praew" Rattaporn as Mook
 Rathavit Kijworalak as Wit
 Nonthanee "Guy" Jirapun as Ess
 Somkid "Nice" Vichapol (September 2, 2000) as Lukmo
 Inthapuch "Tonson" Banyada as Jean
 Phiravich Attachitsataporn as Champ
 Mil Sarut as Dew

Episodes 
The series is based on the novel of the same name. It is broadcast on Sundays from 20:50 to 21:45 (Bangkok Standard Time) on MCOT HD, while the uncut version is shown on Line TV during midnight of the same day. The first season contains a total of 12 episodes with an average span of 45–55 minutes each. The series started its airing on 15 May 2016, and the first season ended on 31 July 2016. And here is the list about the 12 episodes below:

Make It Right: The Series

Episodes in Series 1

Soundtrack 
The following soundtrack below that used in Make it right: The series is with no particular order.

NOTE:
 I Believe True Love Exists (Thai: เชื่อว่ารักแท้มีจริง) by Gun Achi (GMMTV Records, 2016)
 About Last Night (Thai: เรื่องเมื่อคืน ) by Tea Namcha (GMMTV Records, 2016)
 Love Has Gone (Thai: ความรักทั้งเจ็ด ) by Love Seven (GMM GRAMMY, 2016) 
 Can't Hug You (Thai: กอดไม่ได้) by Toey Sittiwat (Crispy Sound, 2016)

References

External links 
 Official Facebook page
 

Thai television soap operas
2016 Thai television series debuts
2017 Thai television series endings
Thai boys' love television series
Television series by Cosocomo
Television shows set in Bangkok
MCOT HD original programming
2010s LGBT-related comedy television series